Ottertail is a city in Otter Tail County, Minnesota, United States. The population was 629 at the 2020 census.

Geography

Minnesota State Highways 78 and 108 are two of the main routes in the community.

Climate
Like the rest of Minnesota, Ottertail has a humid continental climate. It is above the line between the hot and cool summer types of the climate, which means the climate classification is Dfb on the Köppen climate classification. Winters are long and very cold and nights average subzero Fahrenheit. Summers are warm but frequently that weather gets broken up by convective rainfall.

History
Ottertail was platted in 1903, and named for nearby Otter Tail Lake.

“Otter Tail” City appeared on the United States Census as early as 1860.

Demographics

2010 census
As of the census of 2010, there were 572 people, 245 households, and 171 families living in the city. The racial makeup of the city was 99.0% White, 0.2% Native American, and 0.9% from two or more races. Hispanic or Latino of any race were 0.9% of the population.

There were 245 households, of which 22.0% had children under the age of 18 living with them, 57.1% were married couples living together, 9.4% had a female householder with no husband present, 3.3% had a male householder with no wife present, and 30.2% were non-families. 24.9% of all households were made up of individuals, and 8.6% had someone living alone who was 65 years of age or older. The average household size was 2.33 and the average family size was 2.75.

The median age in the city was 47.7 years. 18.2% of residents were under the age of 18; 5.4% were between the ages of 18 and 24; 21.4% were from 25 to 44; 35.2% were from 45 to 64; and 19.6% were 65 years of age or older. The gender makeup of the city was 51.2% male and 48.8% female.

2000 census
As of the census of 2000, there were 451 people, 190 households, and 133 families living in the city. The racial makeup of the city was 99.56% White and 0.44% Native American. 42.8% were of German, 23.7% Norwegian and 7.7% Swedish ancestry.

There were 190 households, out of which 27.9% had children under the age of 18 living with them, 63.2% were married couples living together, 3.7% had a female householder with no husband present, and 29.5% were non-families. 24.2% of all households were made up of individuals, and 9.5% had someone living alone who was 65 years of age or older.  The average household size was 2.37 and the average family size was 2.82.

In the city, the population was spread out, with 21.1% under the age of 18, 7.3% from 18 to 24, 24.2% from 25 to 44, 32.6% from 45 to 64, and 14.9% who were 65 years of age or older.  The median age was 43 years. For every 100 females, there were 115.8 males.  For every 100 females age 18 and over, there were 105.8 males.

The median income for a household in the city was $32,188, and the median income for a family was $43,750. Males had a median income of $23,750 versus $18,438 for females. The per capita income for the city was $18,612.  About 10.2% of families and 12.7% of the population were below the poverty line, including 21.8% of those under age 18 and 4.1% of those age 65 or over.

References

Cities in Otter Tail County, Minnesota
Cities in Minnesota